This is a complete discography of official releases by Tamara Gee, an American-born singer/songwriter and composer whose music includes pop influences. She is signed in a record label Universal Music and Adam Gee Records. Her discography includes three studio albums, six singles (including soundtrack singles), four music videos to date.

Gee's first solo album, Hidden Treasure, was released on September 17, 2007, and distributed by Universal Music Poland. The album debuted at number 44 on the Billboard 200 album charts.

Studio albums

Singles

References

External links
TamaraGee.com

Discographies of American artists
Pop music discographies